Zikanyrops sparsa is a moth in the family Dalceridae. It was described by Walter Hopp in 1928. It is found in southern Brazil. The habitat consists of subtropical lower montane moist forests.

The length of the forewings is 8.5 mm. The forewings are creamy white, delicately sprinkled with dark brown scales, especially between the apex and the cell. The hindwings are creamy white. Adults have been recorded on wing in November.

References

Moths described in 1928
Dalceridae
Moths of South America